GoodRelations is a Web Ontology Language-compliant ontology for Semantic Web online data, dealing with business-related goods and services. It handles the individual relationships between a buyer, a seller and the products and services offered. In November 2012, it was integrated into the Schema.org ontology.

Usage
GoodRelations became popular owing to its success in improving search engine results.

By 2009, the ontology's Product concept was being used to describe over a million products and their prices. By 2013, GoodRelations had been adopted by the search engines Yahoo!, Google, and Bing. An analysis of online e-commerce data providers at that time found it to be the most prevalent ontology in use. As of mid-2015, GoodRelations had become the de facto ontology for e-commerce, and was in widespread use, having been adopted by retailers such as BestBuy.

GoodRelations is additionally used in academic studies of the Semantic Web, as a core ontology.

Example

A shop, restaurant, or store, and its opening hours, may be specified using GoodRelations as in this example, which also uses vCard and FOAF:

<div xmlns:rdf="http://www.w3.org/1999/02/22-rdf-syntax-ns#"
     xmlns="http://www.w3.org/1999/xhtml"
     xmlns:foaf="http://xmlns.com/foaf/0.1/"
     xmlns:gr="http://purl.org/goodrelations/v1#"
     xmlns:vcard="http://www.w3.org/2006/vcard/ns#"
     xmlns:xsd="http://www.w3.org/2001/XMLSchema#">

  <div about="#store" typeof="gr:Location">
    <div property="gr:name" content="Pizzeria La Mamma"></div>
    <div rel="vcard:adr">
      <div typeof="vcard:Address">
        <div property="vcard:country-name" content="Germany"></div>
        <div property="vcard:locality" content="Munich"></div>
        <div property="vcard:postal-code" content="85577"></div>
        <div property="vcard:street-address" content="1234 Main Street"></div>
      </div>
    </div>
    <div property="vcard:tel" content="+33 408 970-6104"></div>
    <div rel="foaf:depiction" resource="http://www.pizza-la-mamma.com/image_or_logo.png">
    </div>
    <div rel="vcard:geo">
      <div>
        <div property="vcard:latitude" content="48.08" datatype="xsd:float"></div>
        <div property="vcard:longitude" content="11.64" datatype="xsd:float"></div>
      </div>
    </div>
    <div rel="gr:hasOpeningHoursSpecification">
      <div about="#mon_fri" typeof="gr:OpeningHoursSpecification">
        <div property="gr:opens" content="08:00:00" datatype="xsd:time"></div>
        <div property="gr:closes" content="18:00:00" datatype="xsd:time"></div>
        <div rel="gr:hasOpeningHoursDayOfWeek"
             resource="http://purl.org/goodrelations/v1#Friday"></div>
        <div rel="gr:hasOpeningHoursDayOfWeek"
             resource="http://purl.org/goodrelations/v1#Thursday"></div>
        <div rel="gr:hasOpeningHoursDayOfWeek"
             resource="http://purl.org/goodrelations/v1#Wednesday"></div>
        <div rel="gr:hasOpeningHoursDayOfWeek"
             resource="http://purl.org/goodrelations/v1#Tuesday"></div>
        <div rel="gr:hasOpeningHoursDayOfWeek"
             resource="http://purl.org/goodrelations/v1#Monday"></div>
      </div>
    </div>
    <div rel="gr:hasOpeningHoursSpecification">
      <div about="#sat" typeof="gr:OpeningHoursSpecification">
        <div property="gr:opens" content="08:30:00" datatype="xsd:time"></div>
        <div property="gr:closes" content="14:00:00" datatype="xsd:time"></div>
        <div rel="gr:hasOpeningHoursDayOfWeek"
             resource="http://purl.org/goodrelations/v1#Saturday"></div>
      </div>
    </div>
    <div rel="foaf:page" resource=""></div>
  </div>
</div>

References
Citations

Sources

 
 
 
 

Semantic Web